Prince Omar bin Faisal of Jordan (born 22 October 1993) is the second child and elder son of Prince Faisal bin Hussein and Princess Alia and is a nephew of King Abdullah II of Jordan. He is the younger brother of Princess Ayah, and older brother to the twins Princess Aisha and Princess Sara.

Ancestry

References

Jordanian royal family information

|-

Living people
1993 births
Jordanian princes
House of Hashim
20th-century Jordanian people
Jordanian people of English descent